Zalán may refer to:

 Zalán or Zălan, a village part of Bodoc, Covasna, Romania
 Zalán (given name), Hungarian masculine name